Linda Kelsey (born 15 April 1952) is a British journalist and author, and a former editor of the UK edition of Cosmopolitan.

Early life
Kelsey was born in north London, and lived in Finchley. She attended a co-educational grammar school in north London.

Career
She became a sub-editor of Good Housekeeping in 1970 for two years. In 1972 she joined Cosmopolitan, then owned by the National Magazine Company (Nat Mags); there were seven staff. In 1975 she became a features editor on Cosmopolitan until 1978. She became Editor of Cosmopolitan in 1985. She became Editor of She in 1989.

Cosmopolitan was launched in the UK in 1972, with Joyce Hopkirk as its Editor.

Publications
 Fifty is Not a Four-letter Word, 2007
 The Twenty Year Itch, 2010

Personal life
She married in 1972, and divorced in 1980, aged 26. She married Christian Testorf in 1999 and they have one son (born July 1988).

See also
 Terry Mansfield, former managing director of National Magazine Company in the 1990s
 Pat Roberts Cairns, former Editor of Good Housekeeping magazine.

References

External links
 Her website

1952 births
British magazine editors
Cosmopolitan (magazine) people
Good Housekeeping
People from Finchley
Living people